Non perdiamo la testa is a 1959 Italian comedy film directed by Mario Mattoli and starring Ugo Tognazzi.

Cast
Ugo Tognazzi as Tony Cuccar
Franca Valeri as Beatrice
Carlo Campanini as Walter
Xenia Valderi as Erminia
Aroldo Tieri as Ispettore di Scotland Yard
Gianrico Tedeschi as Prof. Daniele
Olghina di Robilant
Daniele Vargas as The Butler
Franco Coop as Greenwood
Caprice Chantal as Katy
Daniela Rocca as Violante
Tina Pica as Signora Cuccar

External links

1959 films
1959 comedy films
1950s Italian-language films
Italian black-and-white films
Italian comedy films
Films directed by Mario Mattoli
Films set in England
1950s Italian films